Dingley is an English surname. Notable people with the surname include:

Bert Dingley (1885–1966), American racecar driver
Joan Dingley (1916–2008), New Zealand scientist, expert in the study of fungus
Nelson Dingley Jr. (1832–1899), American journalist and politician from Maine
Robert Dingley (died 1395), MP for Wiltshire
Robert Dingley (died 1456), MP for Hampshire
Robert Dingley (FRS) (baptised 1710–1781), merchant, banker and philanthropist
Robert Dingley (Roundhead) (1619–1660), puritan
Sir Thomas Dingley (died 1539), Catholic martyr executed for treason by Henry VIII
Thomas Dingley (antiquary) (died 1695), also spelled Dineley, English antiquary
Razzle (musician), Nicholas Dingley, (1960–1984) drummer of Hanoi Rocks

English-language surnames